The Secret War was a seven-part television series that was produced by the BBC in conjunction with the Imperial War Museum (IWM) that documented secret technical developments during the Second World War. It first aired during 1977 and was presented by William Woollard, drawing on the first-hand recollections of participants from both sides. The principal interviewee was R. V. Jones, whose autobiography informed much of the research before its publication. The opening music was an excerpt from Mussorgsky's Pictures at an Exhibition. The closing music was by the BBC Radiophonic Workshop.

Episodes

Episode 1: "The Battle of the Beams"
It is largely based on the book Most Secret War, which was written by Jones, who appears in the series. The episode contains rare footage of The Blitz including the Coventry Blitz. Interviewees include Albert Speer, Sir Robert Cockburn and Air vice-marshal Edward Addison.

Episode 2: "To See for a Hundred Miles"
This episode covers the development of radar from its first discovery to the creation of the Chain Home system in time for the Battle of Britain and the subsequent development of the cavity magnetron. The episode goes on to explain how British intelligence learnt of German radar developments, including ,  radar systems and the Operation Biting (the Bruneval Raid) to capture a  system. It also contains details of the RAF Bomber offensive electronic warfare with the  that used devices such as Window, Gee, Oboe, H2S and Airborne Interception radar. It features interviews and demonstrations with Jones, Arnold Wilkins, John Randall and Harry Boot, Bernard Lovell, Donald Bennett, Richard Philipp and others. Speer also appears and talks about the Bombing of Hamburg.

Episode 3: "Terror Weapons"
This episode uncovers the development of Adolf Hitler's vengeance weapons, how British authorities became aware of the menace and what actions were taken to prevent and to delay their use. It features rare footage of the V-1 flying bomb, the V-2 missile and Operation Hydra, the bombing of Peenemünde and details of Operation Most III, along with interviews featuring Jones, Duncan Sandys, Albert Speer, Constance Babington Smith, Roland Beamont, Janusz Groszkowski and Raymond Baxter.

Episode 4: "The Deadly Waves"
This episode examines the magnetic mine and the countermeasures developed to overcome it, including degaussing and features an interview with Lieutenant Commander John Ouvry from HMS Vernon, who defuzed the first intact German magnetic mine recovered by the Allies, on the sands at Shoeburyness, the mine that he recovered being featured in a re-enactment for the episode. It also contains interviews with Commander John Ouvry, Captain Roger Lewis, Sir Charles Goodeve, Sir Edward Bullard and Donald Henley.

Episode 5: "If"
This episode shows certain inventions that never became operational or whose deployment was significantly delayed, therefore leaving one to imagine what could have happened "if" certain developments had achieved widespread use. The programme  features many inventions such as the Messerschmitt Me 321 and Messerschmitt Me 323; various contraptions intended to help the Invasion of Normandy, including the Panjandrum and PLUTO; the  autogyro; early helicopters, British and German bouncing bomb developments; the Henschel Hs 293, the Messerschmitt Me 163 and jet aircraft developments such as the Gloster E.28/39, Messerschmitt Me 262 and Gloster Meteor. Interviewees include Hanna Reitsch, Adolf Galland, Frank Whittle, Stanley Hooker, Constance Babington Smith and Albert Speer.

Episode 6: "Still Secret"
This episode covers the story of the Enigma machine and the Lorenz cipher and how, after valuable initial work by the Polish intelligence service  (BS4) and the French, the codes were broken at Bletchley Park, including some information on the Colossus computer that was still secret when the programme was made. It explains how the codes were broken and how the information was used. It features interviews with Gordon Welchman, Harry Golombek, Peter Calvocoressi, F. W. Winterbotham, Max Newman, Jack Good and Tommy Flowers.

Episode 7: "The Battle of the Atlantic"
This episode is a detailed look into the Battle of the Atlantic, the technical developments and tactics used by both sides during the long and difficult campaign. It features such innovations as Asdic, Type 271 radar,  (wolf pack tactics), catapult fighters, Hedgehog, Huff-Duff, US Blimps, ASV radar, the Leigh light, Metox, Naval H2S radar, Submarine snorkels and escort carriers. Contributions are from Donald Macintyre, Patrick Beesly, Carl Emmermann, Humphrey de Verd Leigh, Hans Meckel, Hartwig Looks and Bernard Lovell. Although included in video versions of The Secret War as a seventh episode, this programme was not made as part of the series and was aired separate from The Secret War when it was first shown. The different introduction, title music and credits betrays that (particularly as "The Secret War" does not appear in the title sequence anywhere, unlike the other six episodes).

Production
The programme credited contributions from:
 Admiralty Degaussing Establishment
 A&AEE Boscombe Down
 Bibliothek für Zeitgeschichte, Stuttgart
 B.I.C.C. Ltd
 British Petroleum
 Ministry of Defence
 Defence Explosive Ordnance Disposal School, Rochester
 Department of the Environment
 Film Polski
 GEC-Henley Ltd
 HMS Belfast
 HMS Collingwood, Portsmouth
 HMS Dolphin, Portsmouth
 HMS Heron, Yeovilton
 HMS Vernon
 National Archive, Washington
 National Film Board of Canada
 National Physical Laboratory
 RAF Museum Hendon
 RAF Farnborough
 RAF Medmenham
 RAF St Athan
 RAF Uxbridge
 The Post Office
 Portsmouth Corporation
 Proof & Experimental Establishment, Shoeburyness
 Rolls-Royce
 Royal Radar Establishment
 Science Research Council
 Admiralty Surface Weapons Establishment, Portsmouth
 Air Commodore Henry Iliffe Cozens provided footage from his 1943 colour film, shot at RAF Hemswell and later released under the title Night Bombers
 United States Air Force
 US Navy

The historical adviser for the series was Alfred Price.

Media
Episodes 1 to 6 were distributed on a double CD by Simply Media, licensed from BBC, titled The Secret War: The Complete Original 1977 Series.

See also
 The World at War

Footnotes

References 

 
 
 

1977 British television series debuts
1977 British television series endings
1970s British documentary television series
British documentary television series
Documentary films about World War II
Documentary television series about aviation
Documentary television series about World War II
English-language television shows
Albert Speer